Farmer is an unincorporated community in Randolph County, North Carolina, United States.

It is located off NC 49, southwest of the highway's intersection with U.S. 64 in Asheboro.

Very little is known about the place, since it is an unincorporated community

There is no flag here, because i don't know.

References

Unincorporated communities in Randolph County, North Carolina
Unincorporated communities in North Carolina